General Swift may refer to:

Eben Swift (1854–1938), U.S. Army major general
Innis P. Swift (1882–1953), U.S. Army major general
James Swift (British Army officer) (born 1967), British Army lieutenant general
John Swift (general) (1761–1814), New York Volunteers brigadier general in the War of 1812
Joseph Gardner Swift (1783–1865), U.S. Army brevet brigadier general